IFSB can mean any of the following:
 Internationaler Fernschachbund
 Islamic Financial Services Board (Malaysia)	
 Independence Federal Savings Bank	
 International Flying Saucer Bureau 	
 International Fitness Sanctioning Body
 International Financial Services Board of Malaysia	
 Indoor Football Scouting Bureau	
 International Foxhunters Stud Book